Žabari is a village and municipality located in the Braničevo District of the eastern Serbia. In 2011, the population of the village was 1,163, while the population of the municipality was 11,380.

Demographics

Economy
The following table gives a preview of total number of employed people per their core activity (as of 2017):

References

External links

Populated places in Braničevo District
Municipalities and cities of Southern and Eastern Serbia